Lasiopetalum baueri, commonly known as slender velvet bush, is a species of flowering plant in the family Malvaceae and is endemic to south-eastern Australia. It is a small, greyish shrub with more or less linear to narrowly oblong or narrowly elliptic leaves and groups of white or pink flowers.

Description
Hairy below, they become smooth above over time. Flowering occurs from September to November and the fruit is a densely hairy capsule  in diameter.

Taxonomy
Lasiopetalum baueri was first formally described in 1806 by Joachim Steetz in Lehmann's Plantae Preissianae from specimens collected by the botanical illustrator Ferdinand Bauer. The specific epithet (baueri) honours the collector of the type specimens.

Distribution and habitat
Slender velvet bush is found in southern South Australia, central and western Victoria, and southwestern New South Wales where it is confined to the vicinity of Rankins Springs, and in the north-east of Tasmania. It grows in mallee communities or coastal cliffs on sandy soil over limestone, the top layer of soil often neutral to acidic, while the subsoil is highly alkaline.

Conservation status
This lasiopetalum is listed as "rare" under the Tasmanian Government Threatened Species Protection Act 1995.

Use in horticulture
Lasiopetalum baueri can be readily grown in dryer climates in well-drained soils and sunny aspects, and is used as a windbreak or hedge. It responds well to being pruned. It was introduced into cultivation in England in 1868. The dried flowers are long-lasting and have potential as a cut flower.

References

baueri
Malvales of Australia
Flora of South Australia
Flora of New South Wales
Flora of Tasmania
Flora of Victoria (Australia)